Fellowship is a Hong Kong based Thoroughbred racehorse.  It is one of those unusual horses who defies the ageing process by improving as he gets older.

In the season of 2005-2006, he won the Stewards' Cup (HKG1). In fact it was his second victory over that illustrious pair as they had also had to watch him go in the HKG2 Cathay Pacific International Mile Trial. He also is one of the nominees of Hong Kong Horse of the Year.

Profile
 Sire:  O'Reilly
 Dam: Mystical Flight
 Dam's Sire: Danzalion
 Sex: Gelding
 Country : 
 Colour :  Bay
 Owner :  David Sin Wai Kin  
 Trainer : Paul O’Sullivan
 Record : (No. of 1-2-3-Starts) 7-8-3-34 (As of 27 February 2012)
 Earnings :  HK$21,011,500 (As of 27 February 2012)

References
 The Hong Kong Jockey Club – Fellowship Racing Record
 The Hong Kong Jockey Club

Racehorses trained in Hong Kong
Hong Kong racehorses
Racehorses bred in New Zealand
Thoroughbred family 13-a